Gabriela Ramos (born April 8, 1964) is a Mexican international civil servant. In 2020 she was appointed Assistant Director-General for Social and Human Sciences at UNESCO.

Biography 
Ramos graduated with a bachelor's degree in international relations from the Universidad Iberoamericana and studied for a master's in public policy at the Harvard Kennedy School. She is married to Ricardo López, with whom she has two daughters.

Career 
Ramos held various positions in the Mexican government, including the Director of Economic Affairs and the OECD in the Ministry of Foreign Affairs between 1995 and 1998. Between 1998 and 2000, she was a founding partner of Portico, a public policy consultancy.

From 2000 to 2006, she worked as director of the OECD's México Centre. In 2008, Ramos was appointed Cabinet Director of the Secretary-General of the OECD, José Ángel Gurría. In 2008, she was also appointed as the OECD's Sherpa for the G20, G7, and APEC. At the OECD, she led the organization's "Inclusive Growth" initiative and the "New Approaches for Economic Growth" (NAEC) initiative.

In 2020, UNESCO Director-General Audrey Azoulay appointed Ramos as Assistant Director-General for Social and Human Sciences. Under her tenure, UNESCO's Social and Human Sciences Sector's primary initiatives include the approval of the Recommendation on the Ethics of Artificial Intelligence in November 2021  and the organization of the Global Forum against Racism and Discrimination.

Other activities  

 Member of the Steering Committee of the Paris Peace Forum.
 Member of the Steering Committee of the Lancet COVID-19 Commission and the Lancet Commission on Gender-Based Violence and Maltreatment of Young People.
 Member of the G7 Gender Equality Advisory Council (GEAC).

Recognition and awards 
In 2013, she was awarded the Order of Merit in the Chevalier degree by the French President, François Hollande.

She received the 2017 Forbes Awards for Excellence in Management. Apolitical listed her among the 100 most significant figures in gender politics.

References 

Universidad Iberoamericana alumni
1964 births
Living people
Harvard Kennedy School alumni